Frederick de Jersey Clere (7 January 1856 – 13 August 1952) was an architect in Wellington, New Zealand.

Biography
He was born in Walsden, near Todmorden, Lancashire and trained as an architect before emigrating to New Zealand with his family in 1877.

He was an architect for 58 years, in Feilding, Wanganui, and Wellington. In 1883 he was made the Diocesan Architect for the Anglican Church in Wellington, designing over 100 churches not only in Wellington but across the lower North Island.  He built a variety of buildings, including the Wellington Harbour Board Head Office and Bond Store and the Wellington Harbour Board Wharf Office Building for the Wellington Harbour Board (WHB) and also designed schools, houses and churches.  In 1891 he designed the extension to the baptistry of Old St Paul's in Wellington.

An advocate of concrete construction (though he wrote a pamphlet on building wooden churches), his best known design is St Mary of the Angels (Catholic, 1922) of reinforced concrete, in Wellington.  Many of his churches are in the Gothic Revival style, for example St Alban's Church in Pauatahanui and the Catholic, St Patrick's Church, Palmerston North which was built in 1925 and renovated and rededicated in 1980 as the Cathedral of the Holy Spirit. He was involved with his architectural partner, John Swan, in designing St Gerard's, Wellington.

In 1935, he was awarded the King George V Silver Jubilee Medal.

He practised on his own and in association with many other architects, including his son. Clere continued working until the age of 92, and died on 13 August 1952 at the age of 96.

See also
 All Saints Church, Palmerston North

References
 Architect of the angels: the churches of Frederick de Jersey Clere by Susan Maclean (2002, Steele Roberts, Wellington) 
 Hints on building wooden churches by Frederick de J. Clere (1886, Ffrost & Manley, Wellington), a 16-page pamphlet

External links
 

1856 births
1952 deaths
New Zealand architects
New Zealand ecclesiastical architects
People from Todmorden
 
English emigrants to New Zealand
Wellington City Councillors
Hutt City Councillors